Hadiza Blell, now Hadiza Blell-Olo, better known by her stage name Di'Ja, is a Nigerian singer. She is currently signed to Mavin Records. In 2009, she released her first single "Rock Steady", which was nominated for Best Urban/R&B Single at the 2009 Canadian Radio Music Awards. Moreover, she won the Best New Artist award at the 2008 Beat Music Awards.

Early life and education
Di'Ja has lived in Nigeria, Sierra Leone, the United States and Canada. Her mother, Asma'u Blell is from Northern Nigeria and her father, Amb Joseph Blell is from Sierra Leone. 

Di'Ja's received a joint degree in biology and psychology.

Career
Her music career started in 2008. In 2012, Di'Ja released several singles, including "Dan'Iska (Rudebwoy)", "Hold On (Ba Damuwa)" and "How Can We Be Friends". On 14 February 2014, Di'Ja signed a record deal with Don Jazzy's Mavin Records. "Yaro", her first official single under the label was also released that same day. It infuses Hausa and Krio dialects in honour of her Nigerian and Sierra Leonean roots.

In May 2014, Di'Ja was featured on "Dorobucci" alongside label mates Don Jazzy, Dr SID, Tiwa Savage, D'Prince, Korede Bello and Reekado Banks. She was also featured on "Arise", alongside Don Jazzy and Reekado Banks. On 15 December 2017, Di'Ja released her extended play Aphrodija, which also features guest vocals from Tiwa Savage and Reekado Banks.

She dropped a hit track tittled "one talk" at the Calabar edition of the Mega Music Nationwide Tour organized by Globacom Telecommunication Company. in May 2017.

Awards and nominations

Discography

Singles

Videography

References

External links
  Official website

Living people
21st-century Nigerian women singers
Nigerian women singer-songwriters
Nigerian people of Sierra Leonean descent
Year of birth missing (living people)